The 1966 Alaska gubernatorial election took place on November 8, 1966, for the post of Governor of Alaska. Republican challenger Wally  Hickel narrowly defeated incumbent Democratic governor William A. Egan, falling just 3 votes short of an overall majority. Hickel had defeated former State House Speaker Bruce B. Kendall and former Territorial Governor Mike Stepovich for the Republican nomination, while Egan was challenged in the Democratic primary by former House Speaker Wendell P. Kay.

Results

References

Gubernatorial
1966
Alaska
November 1966 events in the United States